Frank McCoy (March 31, 1906 – April 1982) was an American Negro league catcher in the 1930s and 1940s. 

A native of Williamsburg, Virginia, McCoy made his Negro leagues debut in 1929 with the Newark Browns Cuban Stars (East). He went on to play for the Newark Browns in 1932, the Newark Dodgers in 1934 and 1935, and the Harrisburg Stars in 1943. McCoy died in Newark, New Jersey in 1982 at age 76.

References

External links
 and Seamheads

1906 births
1982 deaths
Date of death missing
Cuban Stars (East) players
Newark Browns players
Newark Dodgers players
Harrisburg Stars players
Baseball catchers
Baseball players from Virginia
Sportspeople from Williamsburg, Virginia